ACM Guide to Computing Literature is a database, published by the Association for Computing Machinery (ACM), that categorizes and abstracts most computing literature. It contains citations to all ACM publications, as well as literature from other publishers.

The Guide was also published in print from 1977 until 1997. All of the citations included in the printed Guide from 1987 through 1997 are included in the online database; citations from print issues of the Guide published prior to 1987 are not necessarily found in the online version.

The Guide is not to be confused with the ACM Digital Library.  The Digital Library provides complete texts of journals, magazines and conferences sponsored or published by ACM.

See also 
 Association for Computing Machinery
 ACM Digital Library
 ACM Computing Reviews

References

External links 
 
 ACM Guide to Computing Literature — limited access for non-subscribers
 ACM Digital Library — limited access for non-subscribers

Bibliographic databases in computer science
Guide to Computing Literature
Guide to Computing Literature